The PDLCT (for Pod de désignation laser caméra thermique, "thermic camera-mounted laser designation pod") is a french targeting pod build for Thomson-CSF used on Mirage 2000D, notably. They are being superseded by the Damocles (targeting pod).

Targeting pods